Pecos National Forest in New Mexico was established as the Pecos River Forest Reserve by the General Land Office on January 11, 1892 with .  After the transfer of federal forests to the U.S. Forest Service in 1905, it became Pecos River National Forest on March 4, 1907, and was renamed Pecos National Forest on July 1, 1908.  On July 1, 1915 the entire forest was combined with Jemez National Forest to establish Santa Fe National Forest. 

The Pecos forest is administered as the Pecos/Las Vegas Ranger District and a portion of the Espanola Ranger Districts of Santa Fe National Forest, comprising all SFNF lands to the east of Santa Fe.

References

External links
Pecos/Las Vegas Ranger District, Santa Fe National Forest
Forest History Society
Listing of the National Forests of the United States and Their Dates (from the Forest History Society website) Text from Davis, Richard C., ed. Encyclopedia of American Forest and Conservation History. New York: Macmillan Publishing Company for the Forest History Society, 1983. Vol. II, pp. 743-788.

Former National Forests of New Mexico
Protected areas of Mora County, New Mexico
Protected areas of San Miguel County, New Mexico
Protected areas of Santa Fe County, New Mexico